Peter Collins (1941 – 24 October 2015) was an English pipe organ builder based in Melton Mowbray, Leicestershire.  He specialised in tracker action organs. Collins was an advocate of computer-aided design, using it to produce compact instruments and to control material costs.

Collins founded his company in 1964.  Prior to that, he worked in another established organ building firm.  He built organs varying in size from one stop to over 50 stops.  The company entered a creditors voluntary liquidation on 20 January 2017.

Organs in the UK
Examples are to be found in the UK including Greyfriars Kirk, Edinburgh; St Peter Mancroft, Norwich; Orford parish church (formerly at the Turner Sims Concert Hall, Southampton)), and Fitzwilliam College Chapel, Cambridge. His largest organ was built for St David's Hall, Cardiff (subsequently rebuilt in part by Walker).

A notable commission was for the St Albans International Organ Festival (IOF), with which Collins was associated for some time; the IOF organ (sited in St Saviour's church) was built in 1989 in the style of Andreas Silbermann (1678–1734). Peter Hurford, who founded the IOF while he was organist of St Albans Cathedral, played commissioning recitals on a number of Collins organs, and also recorded on some of them.

Organs in other countries
Peter Collins's organs are found in a number of other countries, including Australia, France, Germany (Magdalenenkirche Bayreuth);  
Norway, Korea, Sweden (a controversial collaboration with digital organ builders Allen in Trönö), and the United States.

References

External links 
Obituary

British pipe organ builders
Manufacturing companies established in 1964
People from Melton Mowbray